Thomas Atkinson Thrash was an American college football player. In 1917, during the First World War, he played on the Camp Gordon team.

University of Georgia
Thrash was a prominent tackle for the Georgia Bulldogs of the University of Georgia, twice selected All-Southern. He scored a touchdown in the 7 to 6 upset victory over Sewanee in 1914. Sewanee had not lost at home since 1893. Thrash was captain of the 1916 team.

References

Year of birth missing
Year of death missing
American football tackles
Camp Gordon football players
Georgia Bulldogs football players
All-Southern college football players
People from Meriwether County, Georgia
Sportspeople from the Atlanta metropolitan area
Players of American football from Georgia (U.S. state)